Robert Homer Mollohan (September 18, 1909 – August 3, 1999) was an American politician who served member of the United States House of Representatives from 1953 to 1957 and again from 1969 to 1983. A Democrat from West Virginia, Mollohan was succeeded in Congress by his son, Alan.

Early life and education 
Mollohan was born in Grantsville, West Virginia. He attended Glenville State College, graduating with a Bachelor of Science degree in accounting.

Career 
After finishing his education, Mollohan was hired by the city of Parkersburg, West Virginia as a tax collector. In 1935, he was promoted to the rank of chief of the miscellaneous tax division. In 1939, the city reassigned Mollohan's duties, making him the local director of the Works Progress Administration. In 1940, he briefly worked for the United States Census Bureau.

For eight years, beginning in 1941, Mollohan was director of the West Virginia Industrial School for Boys in Pruntytown, West Virginia. He left this position in 1949 to become a clerk for the United States Senate. He was elected to the U.S. House of Representatives for West Virginia's 1st congressional district in 1953. After just two terms in Congress, however, Mollohan decided to run for governor of West Virginia in the 1956 West Virginia gubernatorial election. He lost the general election to Cecil Underwood. Mollohan did not sign the 1956 Southern Manifesto. In 1958, Mollohan decided to run for his old seat, which was then held by Arch A. Moore Jr., a Republican, but was defeated. He temporarily retired from politics and established an insurance agency.

In 1968, Mollohan again sought his old congressional seat after Moore decided to run for governor. Despite his long absence from Congress, Mollohan was victorious. While in the House for a second time, Mollohan served on the Armed Services Committee and became known for his ability to gain large sums for local 'pork barrel' projects. Mollohan retired from the House in 1983 and was succeeded by his son, Alan, who held the seat until 2011.

External links

References 

1909 births
1999 deaths
People from Grantsville, West Virginia
Works Progress Administration workers
Glenville State College alumni
Politicians from Fairmont, West Virginia
Democratic Party members of the United States House of Representatives from West Virginia
20th-century American politicians